Walter Norris Kirn (born August 3, 1962) is an American novelist, literary critic, and essayist. He is the author of eight books, most notably Up in the Air, which was made into a film of the same name starring George Clooney.

Overview
As a writer, he has published a collection of short stories and several novels, including Thumbsucker, which was made into a 2005 film featuring Keanu Reeves and Vince Vaughn; Up in the Air, which was made into a 2009 film directed by Jason Reitman; and Mission to America. The film adaptation of Up In The Air, which starred George Clooney and Anna Kendrick, was a commercial success and went on to receive critical acclaim as well as numerous nominations and awards. In 2005, he took over blogger Andrew Sullivan's publication for a few weeks while Sullivan was on vacation. He also wrote The Unbinding, an Internet-only novel that was published in Slate magazine. His most recent work, Blood Will Out, is a personalized account of his relationship with the convicted murderer and imposter Clark Rockefeller.

He has also reviewed books for New York Magazine and has written for The New York Times Book Review and New York Times Sunday Magazine, and is a contributing editor of Time, where he has received popularity for his entertaining and sometimes humorous first-person essays among other articles of interest. He also served as an American cultural correspondent for the BBC.

In addition to teaching nonfiction writing at the University of Montana, Kirn was the 2008–09 Vare Nonfiction Writer in Residence at the University of Chicago. He graduated with an A.B. in English from Princeton University in 1983 after completing a 22-page-long senior thesis entitled "Entangling Breaths (Poems)." Following that, he obtained a second undergraduate degree in English Literature at Oxford University, where he was a Keasbey Memorial Foundation Scholar.

Personal life
Kirn was born in Akron, Ohio, but grew up in Marine on St. Croix, Minnesota. After high school, he attended Macalester College for one year before transferring to Princeton University. Kirn's family joined the Church of Jesus Christ of Latter-day Saints when he was twelve, but Kirn is no longer affiliated with the church. In 1995, Kirn married Maggie McGuane, daughter of actress Margot Kidder and novelist Thomas McGuane. Kirn was 32 at the time; McGuane was 19. The couple had two children but have since divorced. Kirn is now married to magazine writer Amanda Fortini. The two split their time between Livingston, Montana and Las Vegas, Nevada.

Bibliography

My Hard Bargain: Stories (1990)
 She Needed Me (1992)
 Thumbsucker (1999)
 Up in the Air (2001)
 Mission to America (2005)
 The Unbinding (2006)
 Lost in the Meritocracy: The Undereducation of an Overachiever (2009)
 Blood Will Out (2013)

Filmography
 Thumbsucker (2005)
 Up in the Air (2009)

References

External links 
 

1962 births
Living people
20th-century American male writers
20th-century American non-fiction writers
20th-century American novelists
21st-century American male writers
21st-century American non-fiction writers
21st-century American novelists
Alumni of the University of Oxford
American male non-fiction writers
American male novelists
American memoirists
Former Latter Day Saints
Harper's Magazine people
The New Yorker people
Place of birth missing (living people)
Princeton University alumni
Time (magazine) people
University of Montana faculty